In human anatomy, the metacarpal bones or metacarpus form the intermediate part of the skeletal hand located between the phalanges of the fingers and the carpal bones of the wrist, which forms the connection to the forearm. The metacarpal bones are analogous to the metatarsal bones in the foot.

Structure

The metacarpals form a transverse arch to which the rigid row of distal carpal bones are fixed. The peripheral metacarpals (those of the thumb and little finger) form the sides of the cup of the palmar gutter and as they are brought together they deepen this concavity. The index metacarpal is the most firmly fixed, while the thumb metacarpal articulates with the trapezium and acts independently from the others. The middle metacarpals are tightly united to the carpus by intrinsic interlocking bone elements at their bases. The ring metacarpal is somewhat more mobile while the fifth metacarpal is semi-independent.

Each metacarpal bone consists of a body or shaft, and two extremities: the head at the distal or digital end (near the fingers), and the base at the proximal or carpal end (close to the wrist).

Body 
The body (shaft) is prismoid in form, and curved, so as to be convex in the longitudinal direction behind, concave in front. It presents three surfaces: medial, lateral, and dorsal.
 The medial and lateral surfaces are concave, for the attachment of the interosseus muscles, and separated from one another by a prominent anterior ridge.
 The dorsal surface presents in its distal two-thirds a smooth, triangular, flattened area which is covered in by the tendons of the extensor muscles. This surface is bounded by two lines, which commence in small tubercles situated on either side of the digital extremity, and, passing upward, converge and meet some distance above the center of the bone and form a ridge which runs along the rest of the dorsal surface to the carpal extremity. This ridge separates two sloping surfaces for the attachment of the interossei dorsales.
 To the tubercles on the digital extremities are attached the collateral ligaments of the metacarpophalangeal joints.

Base 
The base (basis) or carpal extremity is of a cuboidal form, and broader behind than in front: it articulates with the carpal bones and with the adjoining metacarpal bones; its dorsal and volar surfaces are rough, for the attachment of ligaments.

Head 
The head (caput) or digital extremity presents an oblong surface markedly convex from before backward, less so transversely, and flattened from side to side; it articulates with the proximal phalanx. It is broader, and extends farther upward, on the volar than on the dorsal aspect, and is longer in the antero-posterior than in the transverse diameter. On either side of the head is a tubercle for the attachment of the collateral ligament of the metacarpophalangeal joint.

The dorsal surface, broad and flat, supports the tendons of the extensor muscles.

The volar surface is grooved in the middle line for the passage of the flexor tendons, and marked on either side by an articular eminence continuous with the terminal articular surface.

Neck
The neck, or subcapital segment, is the transition zone between the body and the head.

Articulations 
Besides the metacarpophalangeal joints, the metacarpal bones articulate by carpometacarpal joints as follows:
 the first with the trapezium;
 the second with the trapezium, trapezoid, capitate and third metacarpal;
 the third with the capitate and second and fourth metacarpals;
 the fourth with the capitate, hamate, and third and fifth metacarpals;
 and the fifth with the hamate and fourth metacarpal;

Insertions 
Extensor Carpi Radialis Longus/Brevis: Both insert on the base of metacarpal II; Assist with wrist extension and radial flexion of the wrist

Extensor Carpi Ulnaris: Inserts on the base of metacarpal V; Extends and fixes wrist when digits are being flexed; assists with ulnar flexion of wrist

Abductor Pollicis Longus: Inserts on the trapezium and base of metacarpal I; Abducts thumb in frontal plane; extends thumb at carpometacarpal joint

Opponens Pollicis: Inserts on metacarpal I; flexes metacarpal I to oppose the thumb to the fingertips

Opponens digiti minimi: Inserts on the medial surface of metacarpal V; Flexes metacarpal V at carpometacarpal joint when little finger is moved into opposition with tip of thumb; deepens palm of hand.

Clinical significance

Congenital disorders 
The fourth and fifth metacarpal bones are commonly "blunted" or shortened, in pseudohypoparathyroidism and pseudopseudohypoparathyroidism.

A blunted fourth metacarpal, with normal fifth metacarpal, can signify Turner syndrome.

Blunted metacarpals (particularly the fourth metacarpal) are a symptom of nevoid basal-cell carcinoma syndrome.

Fracture
The neck of a metacarpal is a common location for a boxer's fracture, but all parts of the metacarpal bone (including head, body and base) are susceptible to fracture. Several types of treatment exist ranging from non-operative techniques, with or without immobilization, to operative techniques using closed or open reduction and internal fixation (ORIF). Generally, most fractures showing little or no displacement can be treated successfully without surgery. Intraarticular fracture-dislocations of the metacarpal head or base may require surgical fixation, as fragment displacement affecting the joint surface is rarely tolerated well.

Other animals 

In four-legged animals, the metacarpals form part of the forefeet, and are frequently reduced in number, appropriate to the number of toes. In digitigrade and unguligrade animals, the metacarpals are greatly extended and strengthened, forming an additional segment to the limb, a feature that typically enhances the animal's speed. In both birds and bats, the metacarpals form part of the wing.

History

Etymology
The Latin form   more truly resembles its Ancient Greek predecessor μετακάρπιον than metacarpus. Meta– is Greek for beyond and carpal from Ancient Greek καρπός (“wrist”).
The form  is more true to the later Greek form μετακάρπιος. The usage of such hybrids in anatomic Latin is disapproved by some.

Additional images

See also 

Carpometacarpal bossing

References

Further reading
 

Skeletal system
Hand
Bones of the hand
 
Long bones